Maxime Real del Sarte (1888-1954) was a French sculptor and political activist.

Biography

Early life
Maxime Real del Sarte was born on 2 May 1888 in Paris, France, as the son of the sculptor Louis Desire Real and Marie Magdeleine Real del Sarte. He was a cousin of the painter Thérèse Geraldy and was also related to the composer Georges Bizet. He graduated from the École des Beaux-Arts, and by 1911 was at the Académie Julian, where both his mother and an aunt were teachers. He served in World War I, and had his left arm amputated in 1916 after being wounded at Verdun on 29 January.

Sculpture
He was a member of the Société des Artistes Français and exhibited with them from early in his career. He won the Grand Prix national des Beaux-Arts in 1921 for Le premier toit . He designed over fifty war memorials in France, including the Monument aux morts des Armées de Champagne at the Ferme de Navarin at Suippes, which depicts both French and US soldiers (this design was also produced as a medallic plaque). He also designed many statues of Joan of Arc, including one in Rouen placed effectively on the site where she was executed (1928). Additionally, he designed busts for the Dukes of Guise and Orleans, and a monument to King Edward VII at Biarritz (1922).

Politics
He became involved with the right-wing Action française, where he became associated with Charles Maurras, Léon Daudet, Jacques Bainville, Maurice Pujo, Henri Vaugeois and Léon de Montesquiou. He founded and led the royalist organisation Camelots du roi. He was a devout and fervent Roman Catholic and a huge admirer of Joan of Arc. When he found out that Francois Thalamas, a Professor at the Lycee Condorcet who was critical of Joan of Arc, was to give lectures at the Sorbonnes, he made sure to disrupt their course with his collaborators. He founded the organization "Les Compagnons de Jeanne d'Arc". He was wounded in an anti-parliamentary clash on 6 February 1934.

During World War II, he was awarded a medal by the Vichy regime.

Death
He died on 15 February 1954 near Saint-Jean-de-Luz.

Further reading
Anne André Glandy, Maxime Real del Sarte, sa vie - son oeuvre, Plon, 1955, 271 pages.
Baron Jacques Meurgey de Tupigny and Anne André Glandy, L'oeuvre de Maxime Real del Sarte, Plon, 1956, 37 pages + 29 b/w plates
See also List of works by Maxime Real del Sarte

References

1888 births
1954 deaths
Sculptors from Paris
École des Beaux-Arts alumni
20th-century French sculptors
French male sculptors
Politicians from Paris